Laura Bao (born 6 March 1982) is a former professional tennis player from Switzerland.

A right-handed player from Geneva, Bao competed in top international events as a junior, including Wimbledon. She made the girls' doubles semi-finals at the 1998 US Open, partnering Caecilia Charbonnier.

In 1999 she represented Switzerland in a Fed Cup World Group tie against Slovakia. Her only appearance came in the doubles rubber, which she and Charbonnier lost to Karina Habšudová and Henrieta Nagyová.

ITF finals

Singles (2–3)

Doubles (1–4)

See also
 List of Switzerland Fed Cup team representatives

References

External links
 
 
 

1982 births
Living people
Swiss female tennis players
Tennis players from Geneva